Ādi purāṇa is a 9th century Sanskrit poem composed by Jinasena, a Digambara monk. It deals with the life of Rishabhanatha, the first Tirthankara.

History
Adi Purana was composed by Jinasena (a Digambara monk) as a Sanskrit poem praising the life of first Tirthankara, Rishabhanatha. According to Jain tradition, it was composed in 9th century CE.

Content
The work focusses in his own unique style the pilgrimage of a soul to perfection and attainment of mukti. In the work, the struggle for power and control over the entire world of two brothers Bharata and Bahubali, sons of Rishabhadeva. While Bahubali wins, he renounces the worldly pursuits in favor of his brother. Many Jaina Puranas of the Middle Ages found a role model in this work.

Famous quote
A famous quote from Adi Purana is-

Kannada version 
A 10th-century Kannada text written in Champu style, a mix of prose and verse, dealing with the ten lives of the first tirthankara, Adinatha in sixteen cantos. This work is known to be the first work of Kannada poet Adikavi Pampa (941 CE). It is based on the original Sanskrit version by Jinasena acharya.

A court poet of Chalukya king Arikesari II, a Rashtrakuta feudatory, he is most known for his epics, Vikramarjuna Vijaya (Pampa Bharata) and Adipurana, both written in Champu style, which he created and served as the model for all future works in the Kannada. The works of Jain writers Adikavi Pampa, Sri Ponna and Ranna, collectively called the "three gems of Kannada literature", heralded the age of classical Kannada in the 10th century, the Medieval Kannada literature.

See also 
Mahapurana (Jainism)

Notes

References
 
 
 
 
 
 
 

Jain texts
Epic poems in Sanskrit
Kannada literature
10th-century books
Indigenous Aryanism